Tristramella sacra, the long jaw tristramella, is a species of cichlid fish that was endemic to the Sea of Galilee in Israel. It has not been recorded since 1990, despite searches both of the lake and in local markets, and it is regarded as extinct by the IUCN.

T. sacras spawning ground was the marshy northern margin of the lake. This dried out in 1991 and again in the mid-1990s, destroying this species' breeding habitat and therefore possibly causing its disappearance.

Water levels in the Sea of Galilee may have been under stress since Israel's National Water Carrier was built in 1964, and this stress may have been increased since the Israel–Jordan peace treaty of 1994 committed Israel to supply 50 million cubic meters of water per year from the lake to Jordan.

See also 
 Wildlife of Israel

References 

sacra
Fish of Israel
Endemic fauna of Israel
Taxa named by Albert Günther
Taxonomy articles created by Polbot
Fish described in 1865
Sea of Galilee
Cichlid fish of Asia
Freshwater fish of Western Asia

he:אמנון (דג)#מינים שונים של אמנון